Choi Jong-il (born November 5, 1965) is a South Korean president and CEO of Iconix Entertainment. Choi is best known as the creator of Pororo.

Pororo The Little Penguin 
Choi created Pororo the Little Penguin, which sold to 130 countries.

References

External links 
Iconix Official Website 

1965 births
South Korean chief executives
Living people
Place of birth missing (living people)